Frangula betulifolia, the birchleaf buckthorn, is a shrub or small tree in the buckthorn family, Rhamnaceae. It is native in northern Mexico in the Sierra Madre Occidental cordillera, and mountainous, desert regions of the Southwestern United States of Arizona, Utah, New Mexico, and far west Texas; besides being found in Sonora, Chihuahua and Durango of the Occidental cordillera, a large species locale occurs to the east in Nuevo León.

Frangula betulifolia has large ovate leaves, and can grow to be a small tree from 3-10m tall. Blooms in spring, May–June, followed by black-purple fruits in fall. The inner bark was chewed by Native Americans for medicinal purposes.

The former variety obovata with rounder leaves, occurring from southern Nevada through northern Arizona and southern Utah to southwestern Colorado, is now a separate species Frangula obovata.

Range
The core range of the birchleaf buckthorn is the northern Sierra Madre Occidental cordillera, from central Durango, north to west-southwest Chihuahua, and eastern Sonora; it also ranges just north at the Arizona-New Mexico, Sonora-Chihuahua borders, a region called the Madrean Sky Islands, of sky island mountain ranges.

Other medium-sized range locales occur at: central, southwest New Mexico, (an extension east from the Mogollon Rim–White Mountains of the Arizona transition zone); the Grand Canyon of the Colorado River with the range extending upriver into the Canyon Lands of southeast Utah; western Texas; and southern Nuevo León. Other states with more minor-sized locales are Nevada, Coahuila, and Tamaulipas.

Uses
Various songbirds and small mammals consume the berries, which are edible but unpalatable, and deer and bighorn sheep browse the foliage.

References

External links
CalPhotos

Ethnobotany
Common and Traditionally Used Plants, Rhamnus betulifolia; Photo

betulifolia
Flora of Northwestern Mexico
Flora of Northeastern Mexico
Flora of the Southwestern United States
Flora of the South-Central United States
Flora of the Chihuahuan Desert
Flora of the Sierra Madre Occidental
Taxa named by Edward Lee Greene
Flora without expected TNC conservation status